Boxberg (also: Boxberg/O.L. or Boxberg/Oberlausitz) is a municipality in the Görlitz district in Saxony, Germany. The place is known for its large Boxberg Power Station, that uses lignite as fuel.

The municipality is part of the recognized Sorbian settlement area in Saxony. Upper Sorbian has an official status next to German, all villages bear names in both languages.

In October 2007 it absorbed the former municipality Uhyst, and in February 2009 Klitten.

References

External links 
 

 
Towns in Görlitz (district)